Mohsen Mohamed Abdel-Mohsen Anani Yousef Mustafa (born 21 May 1985) is an Egyptian hammer thrower. He was born in Tunis, Tunisia. He transferred his eligibility to his native Tunisia in 2017.

He started as a shot putter, following that El Anany was recruited by former African shot put champion Nagui Asaad, who was setting up a throwing school that also included discus thrower Omar Ahmed El Ghazaly and shot putter Yasser Fathy Ibrahim Farag.

His personal best throw is 77.36 metres, achieved on March 29, 2010, in Al Qâhira. This is the current national record.

International competitions

References

External links

1985 births
Living people
Sportspeople from Tunis
Egyptian male hammer throwers
Tunisian male hammer throwers
Olympic athletes of Egypt
Athletes (track and field) at the 2008 Summer Olympics
World Athletics Championships athletes for Egypt
African Games silver medalists for Egypt
African Games medalists in athletics (track and field)
Athletes (track and field) at the 2003 All-Africa Games
Athletes (track and field) at the 2007 All-Africa Games
Athletes (track and field) at the 2005 Mediterranean Games
Mediterranean Games competitors for Egypt
20th-century Egyptian people
21st-century Egyptian people